The fifth Central American Championships in Athletics were held at the Estadio Mateo Flores in Guatemala City, Guatemala, between December 4-6, 1970.

Medal summary
Some results and medal winners could be reconstructed from the archive of Costa Rican newspaper La Nación.

Men

Women

References

Central American Championships in Athletics
Central American Championships in Athletics
Central American Championships in Athletics
Central American Championships in Athletics
Sport in Guatemala City
International athletics competitions hosted by Guatemala